Krzysztof Lisek (born May 28, 1967 in Gdańsk) is a Polish politician.  He was elected to the Sejm on 25 September 2005 getting 10,731 votes in 34 – Elbląg for Civic Platform.

See also
Members of Polish Sejm 2005-2007

External links
Krzysztof Lisek - parliamentary page - includes declarations of interest, voting record, and transcripts of speeches.

1967 births
Living people
Members of the Polish Sejm 2005–2007
Civic Platform politicians
Civic Platform MEPs
MEPs for Poland 2009–2014
Recipients of St. George's Order of Victory
Members of the Polish Sejm 2007–2011